Lizzie Aiken (1817–1906) was a nurse in the American Civil War, who was widely known as “Aunt Lizzie”.

Early life and family
Eliza Atherton, known as “Lizzie”, was born in the town of Auburn, New York in 1817. The daughter of Steadman Atherton (1791-1856) and Deborah Ward. Both her parents were from Cavendish, Vermont.

In 1826, at the age of nine, the family returned to the  Atherton Farmstead in Cavendish, which was owned by her grandfather, Jonathan Atherton.

When she was sixteen, her mother became ill and Lizzie spent the next four years caring for her. Once her mother's health improved, she enrolled in the New England Academy in Cavendish.

Personal life
In 1837, ages 20, she married Cyrus Aiken, nine years her senior, and they honeymooned in Boston.

Choosing to relocate to Grand Detour, Illinois, the journey would have involved travel by stage coach, navigating the Erie Canal and boarding a series of sailing vessels through the Great Lakes, first to Detroit, and onto Chicago, where they remained for a short time, until reaching the Rock River area of Illinois. This journey westwards involved much hardship, suffering and discomfort, particularly with the loss of her follow on shipment of personal heirlooms she had inherited from her grandmother, which sank to the bottom of Lake Erie.

She raised a young family, in a colony of other emigres from Vermont, including the blacksmith, John Deere (inventor). A series of misfortunes occurred with an outbreak of Cholera, resulting in the loss of all four of her young boys in 1852. Her brother Ward and sister Roxy arrived to console her. Within eleven days her sister had succumbed to cholera.

Her father died in 1856. When her husband became mentally ill, she worked as a domestic nurse to help defray his medical expenses and help support her mother, who was living in Vermont. She also lost possession of their homestead. A while later her new home was destroyed after being struck by lightning.

Aiken was a deeply religious person and was an active member of her local baptist congregation.

Civil War Service

Aiken, now a widow, enlisted as a nurse with the 6th Illinois Cavalry Regiment at the beginning of the American Civil War. Serving under Austrian born, Dr John N. Niglas, she nursed soldiers in the sick tents near Peoria, Illinois.

In November 1861, she accompanied the 6th Illinois Cavalry to Shawnee Town, on the Ohio River. Her comfort and care resulted in the nickname “Aunt Lizzie.” At first she worked for no pay but eventually received $12 per month from the Union Army.

In 1862, she wrote to a friend:

In January, 1862, she wrote to another friend  as follows:

She would later care for Union soldiers at Ovington Hospital in Memphis, Tennessee. She was friends with Mary A. "Mother" Sturges.

In 1864, the ladies of the Peoria Loyal League raised the money so she could visit her mother in Cavendish for three weeks.

Aiken became sick and returned to Peoria where she was nursed back to health. In 1867, she joined the Second Baptist Church and worked as missionary until her death in 1906.

Honors and tributes
She was personally known to every U.S. president from Abraham Lincoln (16th President),   through to  Grover Cleveland (who served as the 22nd President). Some biographers have referred to Aiken as America's own “Florence Nightingale”.

Aiken was an honored guest and speaker at the many Grand Army of the Republic events she attended.

Aiken died on January 17, 1906, aged 88. A funeral service was held at the Second Baptist Church in Chicago on January 20, 1906. The casket was draped in the American flag. In attendance were several well known ministers, judges and merchants. Of particular note were the tributes from pastor John Roach Straton, Reverend Galusha Anderson and other ministers and her nephew Frank S. Atherton. At the end of the service, Members of the Grand Army of the Republic escorted the hearse to her place of rest at Graceland Cemetery. Some sources incorrectly state that she was laid to rest at Rosehill Cemetery, Chicago, Illinois.

A number of newspapers paid homage to her. The following tribute from 1906 is from the Christian Herald:

Ancestry
Her family came from Cavendish, Vermont. The Atherton family ancestry is from Lancashire, England. Her ancestral home, the Atherton Farmstead, is a historic farm located at 31 Greenbush Road in Cavendish, Vermont.  Built in 1785, it is one of the oldest in the rural community, and is its oldest known surviving tavern house.  It was listed on the National Register of Historic Places in 2002.

Her maternal grandfather was John Ward who was related to General Artemas Ward, a leader of the American Revolution.

Further reading

 Anderson, Mary Eleanor (Mrs Galusha Anderson). (1880). The Story of Aunt Lizzie Aiken. Jansen, McClurg & Company, Chicago.
 Hall, Richard H. (2006). Women on the Civil War Battlefront. Lawrence: University Press of Kansas. 
 Massey, M. Elizabeth. (1994). Women in the Civil War. Lincoln: University of Nebraska Press.
 Woods, A. Rose. (1927). Illinois women in the civil war.
McKenzie, T. (2004, Sep 20). Civil war medicine is on display - re-enactors explain the brutal tools of surgery, reputation of early nurses. Journal Star

Portrayals on TV
PBS - Mercy Street:  The Diabolical Plot. Episode 6. 2016 American Civil War Drama

See also

 6th Illinois Cavalry Regiment
 Susan Cox (Civil War nurse)
 Mary Moore (Civil War nurse)
 Mary A. Gardner Holland
 Martha Baker
 Lucy Fenman Barron
 Estelle Johnson (Civil War nurse)
 Mary Loomis
 M.V. Harkin

References

External links
Cavendish Historical Society
 Peoria Historical Society

1817 births
1906 deaths
19th-century American people
People from Auburn, New York
Female wartime nurses
Nursing in the United States